The 1992 Pepsi Canadian Junior Curling Championships were held in Vernon, British Columbia.

Men's

Teams

Standings

Results

Draw 1

Draw 2

Draw 3

Draw 4

Draw 5

Draw 6

Draw 7

Draw 8

Draw 9

Draw 10

Draw 11

Draw 13

Draw 16

Draw 18

Draw 19

Draw 21

Playoffs

Tiebreaker #1

Tiebreaker #2

Semifinal

Final

Women's

Teams

Standings

Results

Draw 1

Draw 2

Draw 3

Draw 4

Draw 5

Draw 6

Draw 7

Draw 8

Draw 9

Draw 10

Draw 12

Draw 14

Draw 15

Draw 17

Draw 20

Draw 22

Tiebreakers

Tiebreaker #1

Tiebreaker #2

Playoffs

Semifinal

Final

External links
Men's statistics
Women's statistics

Canadian Junior Curling Championships
Curling in British Columbia
Sport in Vernon, British Columbia
Canadian Junior Curling Championships
1992 in British Columbia